Jeffery Wilson Jr. (born November 16, 1995) is an American football running back for the Miami Dolphins of the National Football League (NFL). He played college football at North Texas and signed with the San Francisco 49ers as an undrafted free agent in 2018.

Early life
Wilson attended and played high school football at Elkhart High School in Texas. He was named an AP Class 2A first-team all-state as a senior after rushing for 2,749 yards and 36 touchdowns. He received offers from North Texas, Louisiana-Monroe, New Mexico State, and Texas State. He chose to play college football for North Texas.

College career
Wilson appeared in 41 games (29 starts) during his four-year career at North Texas. He rushed for 3,205 yards and 32 touchdowns on 562 attempts, while adding 70 receptions for 527 yards and two touchdowns. He finished his college career ranked third in rushing touchdowns (32) and fourth in rushing yards (3,205) in school history.

Collegiate statistics

Professional career

San Francisco 49ers

2018 season
Wilson signed with the San Francisco 49ers as an undrafted free agent on May 1, 2018. He was waived on September 1, 2018 and was signed to the practice squad the next day. He was promoted to the active roster on November 24, 2018.

Wilson made his NFL debut against the Tampa Bay Buccaneers in Week 12. He had seven carries for 33 rushing yards in the 9–27 road loss.

Wilson finished his rookie year with 266 rushing yards and 98 receiving yards.

2019 season
On August 31, 2019, Wilson was waived by the 49ers and was signed to the practice squad the next day.

On September 14, 2019, Wilson was promoted to the active roster after Tevin Coleman was injured in the season opener against the Tampa Bay Buccaneers. During Week 2 against the Cincinnati Bengals, Wilson rushed 10 times for 34 yards and two touchdowns in the 41–17 road victory. In the next game against the Pittsburgh Steelers, Wilson rushed eight times for 18 yards and two touchdowns in the 24–20 victory. During a Week 11 36–26 victory against the Arizona Cardinals, Wilson caught the game-winning touchdown from Jimmy Garoppolo for his first NFL receiving touchdown.

Wilson finished his second season with 27 carries for 105 yards and four touchdowns along with three receptions for 34 yards and a touchdown. The 49ers reached Super Bowl LIV, but lost 31–20 to the Kansas City Chiefs. In the Super Bowl, he caught a 20-yard reception.

2020 season

On April 20, 2020, Wilson was re-signed by the 49ers to a one-year contract. He was placed on the reserve/COVID-19 list by the team on July 30, 2020, and activated from the list five days later.

In Week 3 against the New York Giants, Wilson recorded 69 yards from scrimmage and two touchdowns (one rushing and one receiving) during the 36–9 win. In Week 7 against the New England Patriots, he had 17 carries for 112 rushing yards and three rushing touchdowns before leaving the 33–6 victory with a high-ankle sprain. He was placed on injured reserve on October 31. He was activated on November 28, 2020. In Week 16 against the Arizona Cardinals, he had 22 carries for a career-high 183 rushing yards and a reception for a 21-yard receiving touchdown in the 20–12 victory.

2021 season
Wilson signed a one-year contract extension with the 49ers on January 26, 2021. He was placed on the reserve/PUP list on August 31, 2021. He was activated on November 6.

2022 season
On March 29, 2022, Wilson re-signed with the 49ers.

Miami Dolphins
On November 1, 2022, the 49ers traded Wilson to the Miami Dolphins in exchange for a fifth-round pick in the 2023 NFL Draft.

Wilson signed a two-year contract extension with the Dolphins on March 16, 2023.

NFL career statistics

References

External links
San Francisco 49ers bio
North Texas Mean Green bio

1995 births
Living people
American football running backs
Miami Dolphins players
North Texas Mean Green football players
People from Anderson County, Texas
Players of American football from Texas
San Francisco 49ers players